Tenkasi Vallinayagam Rathnam (1930 - 17 October 1984)   hailed from Tenkasi, Madras Presidency, British India.  She was a playback singer for Tamil films.

Early life
Born in Tenkasi to Vallinayagam Pillai and Aavudai Ammal in 1929. Rathnam had learned music from the age of seven under a guru called Ramalinga Aachari, and gave her first full-fledged concert in Sri Lanka. She became a drama artiste and film artist as a child. Pursued her tutelage under Vidhwan Ramnad Krishnan at the age at 12 which paved way for playback singing later.

Married to Visvanathan Pillai in 1947.

Then she moved on to playback singing in the Tamil film industry.

Career life
She was 10 years old when she acted in Bhaktha Chetha in 1940 for the Madras United Artitstes. She then acted as the child Kannagi in Kannagi in 1942 for the Jupiter Pictures and also sang her own song. In the meantime, she had continued her training under Ramnad Krishnan, and later trained under Chembai Vaidyanatha Bhagavatar.

Rathnam was a much sought after singer in the late 1940s and 1950s. She became popular with the film music directors of that era who had worked with her repeatedly and in that glorious period TVR rendered a staggering variety of challenging songs.

Rathnam became famous by her songs in Miss Malini (1947) by the Gemini Studios. She also had a rare chance in Ponmudi (1950) by Modern Theatres when the music director the great G. Ramanathan had sung the songs by his composition, himself. He had chosen TVR to pair him as the female singer for him.

Music composers she sang for

Playback singers she sang with
She had many solo songs but also sang with other singers. She sang along duets with G. Ramanathan, M. M. Mariappa, T. A. Mothi, Thiruchi Loganathan, C. R. Subburaman, A. M. Rajah, T. M. Soundararajan, Seerkazhi Govindarajan, S. C. Krishnan, P. B. Sreenivas, S. V. Ramanan, V. J. Varma, V. T. Rajagopalan and S. V. Ponnusamy.

She also sang duets with female singers with most notably with P. Leela, A. P. Komala, N. L. Ganasaraswathi, K. V. Janaki, T. R. Bhagirathi, Jikki, K. Jamuna Rani, Radha Jayalakshmi, A. G. Rathnamala, Udutha Sarojini, M. L. Vasanthakumari, P. Susheela, L. R. Eswari, Soolamangalam Rajalakshmi, Gomathi, Swarnalatha and G. Kasthoori.

The singing actors she sang with were T. R. Mahalingam, K. R. Ramasamy and K. S. Angamuthu.

Filmography

Playback singer

References

 With music till the last

External links
 
 
 
 

Apart from these songs T V Rathnam has sung many songs. To quote an example she has sung a song ADAKKIDUVEN  a duet with S C Krishnan in the movie Aval Yaar.

1930 births
1984 deaths
Women Carnatic singers
Carnatic singers
20th-century Indian singers
Tamil playback singers
Tamil singers
People from Tirunelveli district
Indian women playback singers
20th-century Indian women singers
Women musicians from Tamil Nadu